Coura may refer to the following places in Portugal:

 Coura (Armamar), a civil parish in the municipality of Armamar
 Coura (Paredes de Coura), a civil parish in the municipality of Paredes de Coura